Anna Friedrike Heinel (1753–1808) was a German ballerina who trained in Stuttgart. She enjoyed a highly successful career both in Paris and London.

Biography
Born in Bayreuth, Heinel studied under Jean-Georges Noverre in Stuttgart where she made her début in 1767. The following year, she performed La Vénitienne in Paris where she was known as "La Reine de la danse" (Queen of the Dance). She went on to create roles in Omphale (1769), Hippomène et Atalante (1769), Le Prix de la Valeur (1771) and La Cinquantaine (1771). As a result of her exceptional ability (she is thought to have invented the pirouette), she became a threat to Gaétan Vestris with the result that she was relegated to secondary roles. She therefore left Paris for London where she danced for a time at the King's Theatre with Noverre.

In 1773, she returned to Paris where she was well received. There she danced in Orphée et Euridice (1774), Appelle et Campagne (1776), Alceste (1776), Armide (1777), Les Horaces (1777), La Fête de Village (1778), Iphigénie en Tauride (1779), Echo et Narcisse (1779), Atys (1780) and La Fête de Mirza (1781). She retired from the stage in 1782.

In Paris, she had a relationship with Vestris, having a child, Adolphe, with him in 1791, and marrying him in 1792. She died in Paris on 17 March 1808.

References

1753 births
1808 deaths
German ballerinas
People from Bayreuth
Prima ballerinas
18th-century German ballet dancers